This is a list of Russula species. The genus has a widespread distribution, and contains about 750 species.

Species

A

 Russula abbotensis  K. Das & J.R. Sharma 2005
 Russula abietina  Peck
 Russula abietum  (J. Blum) Bon
 Russula acetolens Rauschert
 Russula aciculocystis  Kauffman ex Bills & O. K. Mill.
 Russula acriannulata  Buyck
 Russula acrifolia Romagn.
 Russula acris  Steinhaus 1888
 Russula acriuscula  Buyck
 Russula acrolamellata  McNabb
 Russula acuminata  Buyck
 Russula acutispora  R. Heim
 Russula adalbertii  Reumaux, Moënne-Locc. & Bidaud
 Russula adelae  Cern.
 Russula admirabilis  Beardslee & Burl. 1939
 Russula adulterina Fr.
 Russula adusta (Pers.) Fr. – winecork brittlegill
 Russula aerina  Romagn.
 Russula aeruginascens  Peck
 Russula aeruginea Fr. – grass-green russula
 Russula aeruginescens
 Russula aeruginosa
 Russula affinis
 Russula africana
 Russula afrodelica
 Russula afrodelicata
 Russula afronigricans
 Russula agaricina
 Russula agglutinata
 Russula alachuana Murrill
 Russula alba Velen
 Russula albella Peck
 Russula albiclavipes
 Russula albida Peck
 Russula albidicremea
 Russula albidoflava
 Russula albidolutescens
 Russula albidula Peck
 Russula albiduliformis
 Russula albiflavescens
 Russula albimarginata
 Russula albipes
 Russula alboareolata
 Russula albobrunnea
 Russula albofloccosa
 Russula albolutescens
 Russula albonigra (Krombh.) Fr.
 Russula albonigroides
 Russula alborosea
 Russula albospissa
 Russula alcalinicola
 Russula allochroa
 Russula alnetorum
 Russula alnicrispae
 Russula alnijorullensis
 Russula alpestris
 Russula alpigenes
 Russula alpina
 Russula alpium
 Russula altaica
 Russula alternata
 Russula alutacea (Pers.) Fr.
 Russula alutaceiformis
 Russula alveolata
 Russula amaendum
 Russula amara
 Russula amaranthina
 Russula amarissima
 Russula americana
 Russula amethystina Quél.
 Russula amnicola
 Russula amoena
 Russula amoenata
 Russula amoenicolor Romagn.
 Russula amoenipes
 Russula amoenoides
 Russula amoenolens Romagn. – Camembert brittlegill
 Russula amygdaloides
 Russula anatina
 Russula angustispora
 Russula anisata
 Russula anisopterae
 Russula annae
 Russula annulata
 Russula annulatoangustifolia
 Russula annulatobadia
 Russula annulatolutea
 Russula annulatosquamosa
 Russula anomala
 Russula anthracina Romagn.
 Russula aosma
 Russula appalachiensis
 Russula appendiculata
 Russula aquosa Leclair
 Russula archaea
 Russula archaeofistulosa
 Russula archaeosuberis
 Russula arcyospora
 Russula arenaria
 Russula areolata
 Russula argyracea
 Russula armeniaca
 Russula armoricana
 Russula arnoldae
 Russula arnouldii
 Russula arpalices
 Russula artesiana
 Russula astringens
 Russula atramentosa
 Russula atrata
 Russula atroamethystina
 Russula atrofusca
 Russula atroglauca
 Russula atropurpurea (Krombh.) Britzelm. – dark-purple russula
 Russula atropurpurina
 Russula atrorosea
 Russula atrorubens
 Russula atrorubens
 Russula atrosanguinea
 Russula atrovinosa
 Russula atroviolacea
 Russula atrovirens
 Russula atroviridis
 Russula attenuata
 Russula aucarum
 Russula aucklandica
 Russula aurantiaca
 Russula aurantiicolor
 Russula aurantioflammans
 Russula aurantiofloccosa
 Russula aurantiolutea
 Russula aurantiomarginata
 Russula aurantiophylla
 Russula aurata
 Russula aurea Pers. (= R. aurata) – gilded brittlegill
 Russula aureola
 Russula aureotacta
 Russula aurora – dawn brittlegill
 Russula australiensis
 Russula australirosea
 Russula australis
 Russula austrodelica
 Russula austromontana
 Russula autumnalis
 Russula avellaneiceps
 Russula azurea

B

 Russula bachii
 Russula badia – burning brittlegill
 Russula ballouii Peck
 Russula barlae
 Russula basifurcata
 Russula basiturgida
 Russula bataillei
 Russula batistae
 Russula beardslei
 Russula bella
 Russula bernardii
 Russula betulae
 Russula betularum Hora – birch brittlegill
 Russula betulina
 Russula bicolor
 Russula billsii
 Russula binchuanensis
 Russula binganensis
 Russula blackfordiae
 Russula blanda
 Russula blumiana
 Russula blumii
 Russula bohemiae
 Russula bona
 Russula bonii
 Russula boninensis
 Russula borealis
 Russula boyacensis
 Russula brasiliensis
 Russula bresadolae
 Russula brevipes Peck
 Russula brevis
 Russula brevissima
 Russula britzelmayrii
 Russula brunneipes
 Russula brunneoalba
 Russula brunneoannulata
 Russula brunneoderma
 Russula brunneofloccosa
 Russula brunneola
 Russula brunneomarginata
 Russula brunneonigra
 Russula brunneorigida
 Russula brunneoviolacea
 Russula brunnescens
 Russula burgeae

C

Russula caerulea Fr.
 Russula caeruleoanulata
 Russula caeruleomalva
 Russula californiensis
 Russula calvitiosa
 Russula camarophylla
 Russula campestris
 Russula campinensis
 Russula capensis
 Russula captiosa
 Russula carbonaria
 Russula carmelensis
 Russula carmesina
 Russula carminea
 Russula carminipes
 Russula carnicolor
 Russula carpini
 Russula cartaginis
 Russula cascadensis Shaffer
 Russula castanopsidis
 Russula caucaensis
 Russula caucasica
 Russula cavipes
 Russula cedriolens
 Russula cellulata
 Russula cerasina
 Russula cernohorskyi
 Russula cerolens Shaffer
 Russula cessans Pearson
 Russula chamaeleon
 Russula chamaeleontina (Lasch) Fr. 1838
 Russula chamiteae
 Russula cheelii
 Russula chichuensis
 Russula chlora
 Russula chlorantha
 Russula chlorinosma
 Russula chloroides (Krombh.) Bres. – blue band brittlegill
 Russula chrysodacryoides
 Russula chrysodacryon
 Russula cicatricata
 Russula ciliata
 Russula cinerascens
 Russula cinerea
 Russula cinerella
 Russula cinereopurpurea
 Russula cinereovinosa
 Russula cinereoviolacea
 Russula cinerescentipes
 Russula cingulata
 Russula cinnabarina
 Russula cinnamomea
 Russula cistoadelpha
 Russula cistorum
 Russula citrina
 Russula citrinipes
 Russula citrinochlora
 Russula citrinocincta
 Russula citrinolilacina
 Russula citrinosulcata
 Russula clariana
Russula claroflava Grove – yellow swamp russula
 Russula claroviridis
 Russula claviceps
 Russula clavipes
 Russula clelandii
 Russula clementinae
 Russula clitocybiformis
 Russula clitocyboides
 Russula clusii
 Russula coccinea
 Russula cochisei
 Russula coerulea.
 Russula coffeata
 Russula collina
 Russula columbiana
 Russula columbicolor
 Russula compacta Frost
 Russula compressa
 Russula concolora
 Russula confertissima
 Russula confusa
 Russula congoana
 Russula conicipes
 Russula conjugata
 Russula consobrina
 Russula consobrinoides
 Russula constans
 Russula conviviales
 Russula cookeana
 Russula corallina
 Russula corinthii-rubra
 Russula costaricensis
 Russula crassotunicata
 Russula crataegorum
 Russula crawshayriana
 Russula cremea
 Russula cremeirosea
 Russula cremeirubra
 Russula cremeo-ochracea
 Russula cremeoavellanea
 Russula cremeoflavescens
 Russula cremeolilacina
 Russula cremeolilacinoides
 Russula cremoricolor
 Russula crenulata
 Russula cretata
 Russula cristata
 Russula cristulispora
 Russula crocea
 Russula crucensis
 Russula cruentata
 Russula crustosa Peck
 Russula cupraeoviolacea
 Russula cuprea
 Russula cupreoaffinis
 Russula cupreola
 Russula cupreoviolacea
 Russula curtipes
 Russula curtispora
 Russula cutefracta
 Russula cyanea
 Russula cyanescens
Russula cyanoxantha (Schaeff.) Fr. – the charcoal burner
 Russula cyclosperma
 Russula cypriani
 Russula cystidiosa

D–E

 
 

 Russula densissima
 Russula depallens
 Russula derelicta Reumaux
 Russula deremensis Henn.
 Russula diaboli Singer
 Russula diffusa Buyck
 Russula dipigmentata Singer
 Russula discopus R. Heim
 Russula disparilus Burl.
 Russula dissidens Zvára
 Russula dissimulans Shaffer
 Russula diversicolor Pegler
 Russula drimeia Cooke (1881)
 Russula dryadicola
 Russula dryadicola Fellner & Landa
 Russula drymeja Cooke
 Russula dryophila Sarnari
 Russula dulcis Velen.
 Russula duportii W. Phillips
 Russula dura
 Russula dadmunii Singer
 Russula davisii Burl.
 Russula decaryi R. Heim
 Russula deceptiva Romagn.
 Russula decipiens (Singer) Kühner & Romagn. (1985)
 Russula decolorans (Fr.) Fr. – copper brittlegill
 Russula delica Fr. – milk-white russula
 Russula densifolia Secr. ex Gillet – crowded brittlegill
 Russula densissima
 Russula depallens
 Russula derelicta Reumaux
 Russula deremensis Henn.
 Russula diaboli Singer
 Russula diffusa Buyck
 Russula dipigmentata Singer
 Russula discopus R. Heim
 Russula disparilus Burl.
 Russula dissidens Zvára
 Russula dissimulans Shaffer
 Russula diversicolor Pegler
 Russula drimeia Cooke
 Russula dryadicola
 Russula dryadicola Fellner & Landa
 Russula drymeja Cooke
 Russula dryophila Sarnari
 Russula dulcis Velen.
 Russula duportii W. Phillips
 Russula dura Burl
 Russula earlei Peck
 Russula eburneoareolata Hongo
 Russula eccentrica Peck
 Russula echinosperma R. Heim & Gilles
 Russula echinospora R. Heim
 Russula echinospora Singer
 Russula edulis B.Buyck and V. Hofstetter
 Russula elaeodes
 Russula elaeodes Romagn. ex Bon
 Russula elatior Lindblad
 Russula elegans Bres.
 Russula elephantina
 Russula ellenae Thiers
 Russula emetica (Schaeff.) Pers. – the sickener
 Russula emeticella
 Russula emeticicolor Jul. Schäff.
 Russula emeticiformis Murrill
 Russula eogranulata Secr. ex Singer
 Russula eogranulata Singer
 Russula eperythra Singer, Alfaro & L. D. Gómez
 Russula epitheliosa Singer
 Russula erubescens Zvára
 Russula erumpens Cleland & Cheel – erupting mushroom
 Russula erythropus Fr. ex Pelt.
 Russula esculenta Pers.
 Russula esperidis Sarnari
 Russula europae J. Blum ex Romagn.
 Russula exalbicans Melzer & Zvára
 Russula excentrica Peck
 Russula excentrica Velen.
 Russula expallens Gillet

F

 Russula fageticola  (Romagn.)Bon
 Russula fagetorum  Bon
 Russula fagetorum  Velen.
 Russula faginea Romagn.
 Russula farinipes Romell
 Russula fastigiata Fatto
 Russula fattoensis Buyck
 Russula faustiana Sarnari
 Russula favrei M. M. Moser
 Russula fellea (Fr.) Fr. – geranium-scented russula
 Russula felleaecolor Bon & Jamoni
 Russula felleicolor Bon & Jamoni
 Russula ferreri Singer
 Russula ferrotincta Singer
 Russula fimbriata Buyck
 Russula fingibilis Britzelm.
 Russula firmula Jul. Schäff.
 Russula fistulosa R. Heim
 Russula flava Romell
 Russula flaviceps Peck
 Russula flavida Frost
 Russula flavisiccans Bills
 Russula flavispora Romagn.
 Russula flavobrunnea Buyck
 Russula flavocitrina J. Blum ex Bon
 Russula flavovirens J. Bommer & M. Rousseau
 Russula flavoviridis Romagn.
 Russula fleischeriana Henn.
 Russula floccosa Lj. N. Vassiljeva
 Russula flocculosa Burl.
 Russula flocktoniae Cleland & Cheel
 Russula floridana Murrill
 Russula flucticolor  Donelli 1997
 Russula foeda Reumaux
 Russula foetens Pers. – foetid russula
 Russula foetentula Peck
 Russula foetida G. Martin
 Russula foetulenta Buyck
 Russula font-queri Singer
 Russula formosa J. Blum
 Russula fosteriana Murrill
 Russula fragaria Kudrna
 Russula fragaricolor Carteret & Reumaux
 Russula fragilis Fr. – fragile brittlegill
 Russula fragrantissima Romagn.
 Russula fragiloides Fr. Murrill
 Russula fragrans Fr. Romagn.
 Russula fragrantissima  Fr. Romagn.
 Russula friesii  Fr. Bres.
 Russula frondosae Fr. J. Blum ex Reumaux
 Russula fucosa Fr. Burl.
 Russula fuegiana Fr. Singer
 Russula fuliginosa Fr. Sarnari
 Russula fulva Fr. J. Blum
 Russula fulvescens Fr. Burl.
 Russula fulvo-ochrascens Fr. Buyck
 Russula fulvograminea Fr. Ruots., Sarnari & Vauras
 Russula furcata Fr.  Fr.
 Russula furcatifolia Fr.  Murrill
 Russula fusca Fr. Quél.
 Russula fuscescens Fr. Velen.
 Russula fusco-ochracea Fr. Velen.
 Russula fuscogrisea Fr. Petch
 Russula fuscolilacea Fr. Velen.
 Russula fuscomaculata Fr. Romagn.
 Russula fusconigra Fr. M. M. Moser
 Russula fuscoochracea Fr. R. Schulz
 Russula fuscorosea Fr. J. Blum
 Russula fuscorubra Fr. (Bres.) J. Blum
 Russula fuscorubroides Fr. Bon
 Russula fuscovinacea Fr. J. E. Lange
 Russula fuscovinacea  J. E. Lange

G–H

 Russula galactea  Bidaud & Heullant
 Russula galbana  T. Lebel
 Russula galochroa
 Russula galochroides  Sarnari
 Russula gaminii Singer
 Russula gedehensis Henn.
 Russula gelatinascens Singer
 Russula gigasperma Romagn.
 Russula gilva Zvára
 Russula gilvescens Romagn. ex Bon
 Russula glauca Burl.
 Russula glaucescentipes Murrill
 Russula globispora (J. Blum) Bon
 Russula glutinosa Fatto
 Russula gomezii Singer
 Russula goossensiae Beeli
 Russula gossypina Buyck
 Russula gracilipes Romagn.
 Russula gracilis Burl.
 Russula gracillima Jul.Schaff. – slender brittlegill
 Russula graminicolor
 Russula granulata Peck
 Russula granulosa Velen.
 Russula granulosula Murrill
 Russula grata Britzelm. – bitter almond brittlegill
 Russula graveolens Romell
 Russula gregaria (Kauffman) Moënne-Locc. & Reumaux
 Russula grisea Fr.
 Russula griseascens (Bon & Gaugué) Marti
 Russula griseobrunnea McNabb
 Russula griseocarnosa X.H. Wang, Zhu L. Yang, Y.C. Li, Knudsen & P.G. Liu
 Russula griseocephala Buyck
 Russula griseoflaccida Sarnari
 Russula griseostipitata McNabb
 Russula griseoviolacea McNabb
 Russula griseoviridis McNabb
 Russula grisescens (Bon & Gaugué) Marti
 Russula groenlandica Ruots. & Vauras
 Russula grossa Berk.
 Russula grundii Thiers
 Russula guayarensis Singer
 Russula haasii Raithelh.
 Russula handelii Singer
 Russula harkoneniana Buyck
 Russula heimii Singer
 Russula heinemannii Buyck
 Russula helgae Romagn.
 Russula heliochroma R. Heim
 Russula helios Malençon ex Sarnari
 Russula helodes Melzer
 Russula henningsii Sacc. & P. Syd
 Russula herrerae 
 Russula heterochroa Kühner
 Russula heteroderma Romagn. 
 Russula heterophylla (Fr.) Fr. – greasy green brittlegill
 Russula heterospora Beardslee 
 Russula heterosporoides Murrill 
 Russula hibbardae Burl.
 Russula hiemisilvae Buyck 
 Russula himalayana Rawla & Sarwal 
 Russula hixsonii Murrill 
 Russula hobartiae Vidal
 Russula hoehnelii Singer
 Russula hongoi Singer 
 Russula hortensis Sarnari
 Russula horticola Kudrna
 Russula humboldtii Singer 
 Russula humicola Sarnari 
 Russula humidicola Burl.
 Russula hydrophila Hornicek 
 Russula hydropica Buyck 
 Russula hygrophytica Pegler
 Russula hysgina Buyck & E. Horak

I–K

 Russula incarnaticeps Murrill
 Russula inconspicua Velen.
 Russula inconstans Burl.
 Russula incrassata Buyck
 Russula idroboi Singer
 Russula ilicis Romagn 
 Russula illota Romagn.
 Russula imitatrix Homola & Shaffer
 Russula immaculata Dennis
 Russula impolita Bon
 Russula inamoena Sarnari
 Russula incarnata 
 Russula incarnaticeps Murrill
 Russula inconspicua Velen
 Russula inconstans Burl
 Russula incrassata Buyck
 Russula indica Sathe & J. T. Daniel
 Russula inedulis Murrill
 Russula inflata Buyck
 Russula ingen Buyck
 Russula ingwa Grgur
 Russula innocua Romagn
 Russula inopina Shaffer
 Russula inquinata McNabb
 Russula insignis Quél.
 Russula insignita Burl.
 Russula intactior Jul. Schäff. 1939 
 Russula integer Kuntze
 Russula integra (L.)Fr.
 Russula integriformis Sarnari
 Russula intermedia P. Karst.
 Russula intricata Buyck 
 Russula ionochlora  Romagn.
 Russula iterika Grgur.
 Russula ionochlora Romagn. – oilslick brittlegill
 Russula iterika Grgur.
 Russula japonica Hongo
 Russula jilinensis G.J.Li & H.A.Wen
 Russula joannis Bon
 Russula josserandii Bertault
 Russula juniperina Ubaldi
 Russula kalimna Grgur.
 Russula kansaiensis Hongo
 Russula kathmanduensis Adhikari
 Russula kauffmaniana Singer
 Russula kauffmanii Jul. Schäff.
 Russula kavinae Melzer & Zvára
 Russula kellyi Burl.
 Russula kermesina T. Lebel
 Russula kirinea R. Heim
 Russula kivuensis Buyck 
 Russula knauthii Hora
 Russula krombholzii Shaffer

L

 Russula laccata Huijsman
 Russula lactea (Pers.) Fr.
 Russula laeta F.H.Møller & Jul.Schäff.
 Russula lamprocystidiata Buyck
 Russula langei Bon
 Russula languida Cern. & H. Raab
 Russula laricina Peyronel
 Russula laricinoaffinis Bon
 Russula lateralipes Buyck & E. Horak
 Russula lateritia Quél.
 Russula laurocerasi Melzer (syn. of Russula grata)
 Russula leelavathyi K. B. Vrinda, C. K. Pradeep & T. K. Abraham
 Russula leguminosarum Singer
 Russula lenkunya Grgur.
 Russula lentiginosa Buyck & D. Mitch.
 Russula lepida
 Russula lepidicolor Romagn.
 Russula lepidiformis Murrill
 Russula leucomodesta Singer
 Russula leucospora Bon
 Russula levispora Murrill
 Russula levisporiformis Murrill
 Russula levyana Murrill
 Russula lewisii Buyck
 Russula liberiensis  Singer
 Russula lilacea  Quél.
 Russula lilacinicolor J. Blum
 Russula lilacinocremea Romagn.
 Russula lilacinopunctata Romagn.
 Russula lilacipes Shear
 Russula linnaei Fr.
 Russula littoralis McNabb
 Russula littorea Pennycook
 Russula livescens (Batsch) Bataille
 Russula livida Beeli
 Russula lividirosea  Murrill
 Russula lividopallescens arnari
 Russula longipes (Singer) Moënne-Locc. & Reumaux
 Russula ludoviciana Shaffer
 Russula lundellii Singer
 Russula lurida Pers.
 Russula lutea (Huds.) Gray
 Russula luteirosa (Bougher) T. Lebel
 Russula luteispora Murrill
 Russula lutensis Romagn.
 Russula luteoalba Britzelm.
 Russula luteoaurantia Romagn. ex Bon
 Russula luteobasis Peck
 Russula luteofolia Fatto
 Russula luteoloalba Britzelm.
 Russula luteomaculata Buyck
 Russula luteopulverulenta Buyck
 Russula luteorosella Britzelm.
 Russula luteosekta Hornicek
 Russula luteoviolacea Krombh.
 Russula luteovirens Boud.
 Russula luteoviridans C. Martín 1894 
 Russula lutescentifolia Murrill 
 Russula luteirosa  Bougher) T. Lebel 
 Russula luteispora Murrill 
 Russula lutensis Romagn. 
 Russula luteoalba Britzelm. 
 Russula luteoaurantia Romagn. ex Bon 
 Russula luteobasis Peck 
 Russula luteofolia Fatto 
 Russula luteoloalba Britzelm. 
 Russula luteomaculata Buyck 
 Russula luteopulverulenta Buyck 
 Russula luteorosella Britzelm. 
 Russula luteosekta Hornicek 
 Russula luteotacta Rea 
 Russula luteoviolacea Krombh. 
 Russula luteovirens Boud.  
 Russula luteoviridans  
 Russula lutescentifolia Murrill 
 Russula madacassenseHeim

M

 Russula macrocystidiata McNabb  
 Russula macrocystis (R. Heim) Buyck  
 Russula macropoda Singer  
 Russula maculata Quél. & Roze  
 Russula maculosa Murrill  
 Russula madagassensis R. Heim  
 Russula maenadum  R. Heim  
 Russula maesta Kucera  
 Russula magna Beardslee  
 Russula magnifica Peck  
 Russula mairei Singer  
 Russula major Singer  
 Russula mallophora Singer  
 Russula marangania Grgur.  
 Russula marginata Burl.  
 Russula mariae Peck
 Russula marronina Pegler  
 Russula matoubensis Pegler  
 Russula maxima  Burl.  
 Russula maximispora J. Blum ex Bon  
 Russula mayawatiana K. Das, S.L. Mill. & J.R. Sharma  
 Russula medullata Romagn.  
 Russula meleagris Buyck  
 Russula melitodes Romagn.  
 Russula melliolens Quél.  
 Russula melzeri Zvára
 Russula melzeri Zvára  
 Russula memnon Krombh.  
 Russula mendocinensis Thiers  
 Russula mephitica Pegler  
 Russula metachromatica Singer  
 Russula mexicana Burl.
 Russula michiganensis Shaffer  
 Russula microspora Singer  
 Russula mimetica R. Heim  
 Russula miniata McNabb  
 Russula minutalis Britzelm.  
 Russula minutula Velen.  
 Russula mitis Rea  
 Russula mitissima Singer  
 Russula modesta Peck
 Russula mollis Quél.  
 Russula monspeliensis Sarnari  
 Russula montana Shaffer  
 Russula montensis Bidaud, Moënne-Locc. & P.-A. Moreau  
 Russula montivaga Singer  
 Russula moravica Velen.  
 Russula mordax Burl.  
 Russula morganii Sacc.  
 Russula moyersoenii Buyck  
 Russula mukteshwarica K. Das, S.L. Mill., J.R. Sharma & R.P. Bhatt  
 Russula multicolor Bougher & K. Syme  
 Russula multicystidiata McNabb  
 Russula multifurcata Velen.  
 Russula munia Buyck  
 Russula murina Burl.  
 Russula murinacea R. Heim  
 Russula murrillii Burl.
 Russula mussooriensis Rawla & Sarwal  
 Russula mustelina Fr. – russet brittlegill
 Russula mustelinicolor Reumaux, Moënne-Locc. & Bidaud  
 Russula mutabilis Murrill  
 Russula mutantipes Murrill

N–O

 Russula nana Killerm.
 Russula nanella Singer
 Russula narcotica P. Kumm.
 Russula natarajanii K. Das, J.R. Sharma & Atri
 Russula nauseosa (Pers.) Fr.
 Russula neerimea Grgur.
 Russula neglecta Singer
 Russula neodiscopoda Singer
 Russula neoemetica Hongo
 Russula nepalensis Adhikari
 Russula nigrescentipes Peck
 Russula nigricans Bull. ex Fr. – blackening russula
 Russula nigrodisca Peck
 Russula nigropurpurea Bidaud & Moënne-Locc.
 Russula niigatensis Hongo
 Russula nitida  
 Russula nivea Pers.
 Russula nkayambae Buyck
 Russula nobilis Velen. – beechwood sickener (previously Russula mairei Singer)
 Russula norvegica D. A. Reid
 Russula nothofaginea Singer
 Russula novae-zelandiae McNabb
 Russula novispora Murrill
 Russula nuoljae Kühner
 Russula nuragica Sarnari
 Russula obscura (Romell) Peck
 Russula obscuriformis Murrill
 Russula obsoleta Kucera
 Russula obtecta  Singer
 Russula obtusopunctata Buyck
 Russula occidentalis Singer
 Russula ochracea (Alb. & Schwein.) Fr.
 Russula ochraceofuliginosa Beeli
 Russula ochraceorivulosa Buyck
 Russula ochraleucoides Kauffman
 Russula ochricompacta Bills & O. K. Mill.
 Russula ochrocephala Buyck
 Russula ochroflavescens Reumaux
 Russula ochroleuca Pers. – common yellow russula
 Russula ochroleuciformis Murrill
 Russula ochroleucoides Kauffman
 Russula ochrophylla Peck
 Russula ochrosperma Moënne-Locc.
 Russula ochrospora Quadr.
 Russula ochrostraminea Pegler
 Russula ochroviridis (Cooke) Reumaux
 Russula odorata Romagn.
 Russula oinochroa Buyck
 Russula oleifera Buyck
 Russula olgae Velen.
 Russula olivacea
 Russula olivaceomalva Reumaux, Moënne-Locc. & Bidaud
 Russula olivaceoviolascens Gillet
 Russula olivascens Fr.
 Russula olivicolor Britzelm.
 Russula olivina Ruots. & Vauras
 Russula olivobrunnea Ruots. & Vauras 
 Russula omiensis Hongo
 Russula operta Burl.
 Russula oreades Sarnari 
 Russula oreina Singer  
 Russula orinocensis Pat. & Gaillard  
 Russula ornaticeps Burl.

P

 Russula pachycystis Singer
 Russula pacifica Thiers
 Russula pallescens P. Karst.
 Russula pallida P. Karst.
 Russula pallidorimosa Buyck
 Russula pallidospora J. Blum ex Romagn.
 Russula palomet (Thore) Pers.
 Russula paludosa Britzelm.
 Russula palumbina Quél.
 Russula palustris Peck
 Russula panamae Buyck & Ovrebo
 Russula pantherina (Zvára) Moënne-Locc. & Reumaux
 Russula pantoleuca Singer
 Russula papakaiensis McNabb
 Russula papavericolor Reumaux
 Russula papillata R. Heim & Gilles
 Russula paradecipiens (A. Favre) A. Favre
 Russula paraemetica Reumaux
 Russula parahelios D. Antonini & M. Antonini
 Russula parasitica (R. Heim) Buyck
 Russula parazurea Jul.Schäff.
 Russula parodorata Sarnari
 Russula parolivascens Bidaud & Moënne-Locc.
 Russula partirosea Murrill
 Russula parva Carteret & Reumaux
 Russula parvipes Romell 
 Russula parvopurpurea Buyck
 Russula parvorosea Buyck
 Russula parvovirescens Buyck, D.Mitchell & Parrent
 Russula parvula Burl.
 Russula parvulospora Buyck
 Russula pascua Kühner
 Russula patouillardii Singer
 Russula patriotica Murrill
 Russula pauli Schulzer
 Russula pausiaca Buyck
 Russula paxilloides Earle
 Russula peckii Singer
 Russula pectinata (Bull.) Fr.
 Russula pectinatoides Peck (= R. pectinata Peck non Fr.)
 Russula pelargonia Niolle
 Russula pellucida (Gooss. -Font. & R. Heim) Buyck
 Russula perelegans Buyck & E. Horak
 Russula periglypta Berk. & Broome
 Russula perlactea Murrill
 Russula perplexa Burl.
 Russula persanguinea Cleland
 Russula persicina Krombh.
 Russula persobria Kauffman
 Russula pervirginea Murrill
 Russula phaeocephala Buyck
 Russula phlyctidospora (Romagn.) Bon
 Russula phoenix Kucera
 Russula picearum Singer
 Russula piceetorum Singer
 Russula piceicola Sarnari
 Russula picrea Sarnari
 Russula pilatii Zvára
 Russula pilocystidiata McNabb
 Russula pilosella T. Lebel
 Russula pinetorum Murrill
 Russula pinicola Murrill
 Russula pinophila Murrill
 Russula piperata Velen.
 Russula placita Burl.
 Russula pleurogena Buyck & E. Horak
 Russula pluteoides Singer
 Russula pluvialis Singer
 Russula poetae Reumaux, Moënne-Locc. & Bidaud
 Russula poichilochroa Sarnari
 Russula poissonii Bouriquet
 Russula polonica Steinhaus
 Russula polychroma Singer ex Hora
 Russula polycystis Singer
 Russula polyphylla Peck
 Russula porolamellata Melzer
 Russula porphyrocephala Buyck
 Russula postiana Romell
 Russula praeclavipes Murrill
 Russula praecompacta Murrill
 Russula praeformosa Murrill
 Russula praefragilis Murrill
 Russula praepalustris Murrill
 Russula praerubra Murrill
 Russula praerubriceps Murrill
 Russula praetenuis Murrill
 Russula praetermissa Reumaux
 Russula praetervisa Sarnari
 Russula praeumbonata Burl.
 Russula primaverna Fatto
 Russula prinophila Sarnari
 Russula prolifica B.Buyck and V. Hofstetter
 Russula pruinata Buyck
 Russula pruinosa Velen.
 Russula psammophila Singer
 Russula pseudo-olivascens Kärcher
 Russula pseudoaeruginea (Romagn.) Kuyper & Vuure
 Russula pseudoaffinis Migl. & Nicolaj
 Russula pseudoareolata McNabb
 Russula pseudoaurata Jul. Schäff.
 Russula pseudocampestris Kühner
 Russula pseudocarmesina Buyck
 Russula pseudocavipes Bon
 Russula pseudodelica J.E.Lange
 Russula pseudoemetica Kill.
 Russula pseudoepitheliosa Buyck
 Russula pseudofoetens Murrill
 Russula pseudoimpolita Sarnari
 Russula pseudolaeta Sarnari
 Russula pseudolateriticola Buyck
 Russula pseudolepida Singer
 Russula pseudointegra Arnould & Goris ex Maire
 Russula pseudoluteoviridans Romagn.
 Russula pseudomaenadum R. Heim
 Russula pseudomelitodes J. Blum ex Bon
 Russula pseudomelliolens Singer ex Reumaux
 Russula pseudopeckii Fatto
 Russula pseudopectinata Henn.
 Russula pseudopuellaris (Bon) Bon
 Russula pseudopurpurea Buyck
 Russula pseudoraoultii Ayel & Bidaud 
 Russula pseudoriberrima Romagn.
 Russula pseudoromellii J. Blum
 Russula pseudorosea J. Blum
 Russula pseudoruberrima Romagn.
 Russula pseudostriatoviridis Buyck
 Russula pseudosuberetorum Dagron
 Russula pseudovesca J. Z. Ying
 Russula pseudoviolacea Joachim
 Russula pubescens Velen.
 Russula pudica Carteret & Reumaux
 Russula pudorina McNabb
 Russula puellaris Fr.
 Russula puellula Ebbesen, F. H. Møller & Jul. Schäff.
 Russula puiggarii (Speg.) Singer
 Russula pulchella I. G. Borshch.
 Russula pulcherrima Velen.
 Russula pulchra Burl.
 Russula pulchrae-uxoris Reumaux
 Russula pulchralis Britzelm.
 Russula pulchrisperma Buyck
 Russula pulverulenta Peck
 Russula pumicoidea T. Lebel 
 Russula pumila Rouzeau & F. Massart
 Russula punctata Gillet
 Russula punctipes Singer
 Russula pungens Beardslee
 Russula punicea Thiers
 Russula purpurascens Bres. 
 Russula purpurea Gillet
 Russula purpurata Crawshay
 Russula purpureo-olivascens Carteret & Reumaux 
 Russula purpureoflava Cleland
 Russula purpureofusca Kühner
 Russula purpureolilacina Fayod
 Russula purpureomaculata Shaffer
 Russula purpureomutabilis Buyck
 Russula purpureonigra Bidaud & Moënne-Locc.
 Russula purpureoflava Cleland
 Russula purpureotincta McNabb
 Russula purpurina Quél. & Schulzer
 Russula purpurissata Reumaux
 Russula pusilla Peck
 Russula pusilliformis Murrill
 Russula pusillissima Moënne-Locc. 
 Russula putida Sarnari 
 Russula pulverulenta Peck
 Russula pyrenaica J. Blum
 Russula pyriodora Ruots. (2011) – Finland
 Russula pyrrhonii Moënne-Locc. & Reumaux

Q–R

 Russula queletiana Schulzer
 Russula queletii Fr.
 Russula querceti H. Haas & Jul. Schäff.
 Russula quercetorum Velen.
 Russula quercilicis Sarnari
 Russula quercophila Buyck & Halling 
 Russula quercus-oleoidis Singer 
 Russula radicans R. Heim 
 Russula raoultii Quél.
 Russula reddellii T. Lebel 
 Russula redolens Burl. 
 Russula regalis Murrill 
 Russula reisneri Velen. 
 Russula renidens Ruots., Sarnari & Vauras 
 Russula retispora (Singer) Bon 
 Russula reumauxiana A. Favre 
 Russula rhodella E.-J. Gilbert 
 Russula rhodomarginata Sarnari 
 Russula rhodomelanea Sarnari 
 Russula rhodopus Zvára 
 Russula rhodoxantha Peyronel 
 Russula rhytipus Fr. 
 Russula rigelliae Velen. 
 Russula rigida Velen. 
 Russula rimosa McNabb 
 Russula rimulosa Pennycook 
 Russula riograndensis Singer 
 Russula risigallina
 Russula rivulicola Ruots. & Vauras 
 Russula rivulosa Reumaux 
 Russula robertii J. Blum 
 Russula robinsoniae Burl. 
 Russula robusta R. Heim 
 Russula rolfeana L. D. Gómez & Alfaro 
 Russula romagnesiana Shaffer 
 Russula romellii Maire 
 Russula rooseveltiana Murrill 
 Russula rosacea (Pers.) Gray 
 Russula rosea Pers. – rosy russula (= R. lepida Fr, R. rosacea (Pers.) S.F. Gray)
 Russula roseicolor J. Blum
 Russula roseipes
 Russula roseitincta Murrill 
 Russula rosella Romell
 Russula roseoalba Buyck
 Russula roseoaurantia Sarnari
 Russula roseobrunnea J. Blum
 Russula roseoisabellina Murrill
 Russula roseopileata McNabb
 Russula roseostipitata McNabb
 Russula roseostriata Buyck
 Russula roseovelata Buyck
 Russula roseoviolacea Buyck
 Russula rostraticystidia T. Lebel
 Russula rubella A. Blytt
 Russula rubellipes Fatto
 Russula rubens R. Heim
 Russula ruberrima Romagn.
 Russula rubescens
 Russula rubicunda
 Russula rubida Reumaux
 Russula rubra Fr.
 Russula rubriceps Singer
 Russula rubrifolia Murrill
 Russula rubripurpurea Murrill
 Russula rubro-ochracea Murrill
 Russula rubroalba Romagn.
 Russula rubrocarminea Romagn.
 Russula rubrogrisea Reumaux
 Russula rubrolutea T. Lebel
 Russula rubrorobusta Buyck
 Russula rubrotincta Burl.
 Russula rugosella Raithelh.
 Russula rugulosa Peck
 Russula rutila Romagn.

S

 Russula sabulosa Heim & Blum ex Bon 1986  
 Russula saliceticola Kühner ex Knudsen & T. Borgen
 Russula salmoneolutea Landa & R. Fellner
 Russula salmonicolor (Romagn.) Reumaux
 Russula sancti-ramonensis L. D. Gómez, Alfaro & Singer
 Russula sanguinaria (Schumach.) Rauschert – red russula, bloody brittlegill (= R. sanguinea Fr.)
 Russula sapinea Sarnari
 Russula sardonia – changeable russula
 Russula schaefferi Kärcher
 Russula schaefferiana Niolle
 Russula schaefferina Rawla & Sarwal
 Russula schiffneri Singer
 Russula schizoderma Pat.
 Russula schizopellis Sarnari
 Russula schoeffelii Cern. & H. Raab
 Russula scotica A. Pearson
 Russula sejuncta Buyck
 Russula semicrema Fr.
 Russula semililacea Singer
 Russula senecis S. Imai
 Russula seperina Dupain
 Russula seperina
 Russula septentrionalis Singer
 Russula sericatula Romagn.
 Russula sericella Murrill
 Russula sericeonitens Kauffman
 Russula serissima Peck
 Russula serotina Quél.
 Russula sese Beeli
 Russula sesemoindu Beeli
 Russula sesemotani Beeli
 Russula sesenagula Beeli
 Russula siamensis Yomyart, Piap., Watling, Whalley & Sihan.
 Russula sierrensis Thiers
 Russula silvestris (Singer) Remaux
 Russula silvicola Shaffer
 Russula similis Bres.
 Russula simillima Peck
 Russula simulans Burl.
 Russula singaporensis Singer
 Russula singeri R. Heim
 Russula singeriana Bon
 Russula sinuata T. Lebel
 Russula sladkyi Velen.
 Russula smaragdina Quél.
 Russula smithii Singer
 Russula solaris Ferd. & Winge
 Russula solitaria McNabb
 Russula sordida Peck
 Russula sororia (Fr.) Rom.
 Russula sororiicolor Singer
 Russula speciosa J. Blum
 Russula sphagnetorum Romagn.
 Russula sphagnophila Singer
 Russula squalida Peck
 Russula stagnorum Carteret & Reumaux
 Russula stagnosa Reumaux
 Russula steinbachii Cernoh. & Singer
 Russula stenotricha Romagn.  
 Russula straminea Malençon  
 Russula striatella Jul. Schäff.  
 Russula striatoviridis Buyck  
 Russula stricta Murrill  
 Russula stuntzii Grund 
 Russula suavis Schulzer  
 Russula subacris Murrill 
 Russula subaffinis Bidaud & P.-A. Moreau 1996  
 Russula subalbida Bres. 
 Russula subalbidula Murrill  
 Russula subalpina O. K. Mill.
 Russula subalutacea Burl.  
 Russula subarctica I. L. Brunner 
 Russula subazurea Bon
 Russula subbrevis Reumaux 
 Russula subbrunneipes Murrill  
 Russula subcarminea Reumaux  
 Russula subcarnicolor Murrill 
 Russula subcompacta Britzelm.  
 Russula subcremeiceps Murrill 
 Russula subcristulata Romagn. 
 Russula subcrustosa L. D. Gómez & Singer
 Russula subcyanoxantha Murrill
 Russula subdensifolia Murrill  
 Russula subdepallens Peck 
 Russula subelaeodes Reumaux 
 Russula subemetica Reumaux  
 Russula suberetorum Dagron  
 Russula subfistulosa Buyck 
 Russula subflava Murrill  
 Russula subfloridana Murrill 
 Russula subfoetens A.H. Smith
 Russula subfragiliformis Murrill
 Russula subfragilis Romell  
 Russula subfurcata Reumaux   
 Russula subglauca Murrill   
 Russula subgraminicolor Murrill   
 Russula subgranulosa Murrill   
 Russula subincarnata Murrill   
 Russula subinconstans Murrill   
 Russula subintegra J. Blum ex Bon   
 Russula sublaevis (Buyck) Buyck   
 Russula sublevispora Kühner & Romagn.   
 Russula subloculata Trappe, T. Lebel & Castellano  
 Russula sublongipes Reumaux ex Reumaux & Moënne-Locc. 
 Russula subluteobasis Murrill 
 Russula subminutula Singer 
 Russula subnigricans 
 Russula subobscura Murrill   
 Russula subochroleuca Murrill  
 Russula subochrophylla Murrill  
 Russula subolivascens Burl.   
 Russula subpavonina Murrill   
 Russula subpruinosa Murrill  
 Russula subpunctata Kauffman   
 Russula subpurpurea Reumaux ex Reumaux  
 Russula subpusilla Murrill  
 Russula subrubens (J. Lange) M.Bon (= R. chamiteae Kühn.)
 Russula subrubescens Murrill 
 Russula subsericeonitens Murrill  
 Russula subseriflua Buyck 
 Russula subsilvestris Carteret & Reumaux 
 Russula subsmaragdina Reumaux  
 Russula subsordida Peck  
 Russula substiptica Pers.   
 Russula substraminea Sarnari  
 Russula subsulphurea Murrill   
 Russula subtenuiceps Fatto   
 Russula subterfurcata Romagn.   
 Russula subtilis Burl.   
 Russula subtomentosa (Sarnari) Sarnari  
 Russula subtorulosa Singer   
 Russula subusta Burl.  
 Russula subvariata Murrill  
 Russula subvelata Singer   
 Russula subvelutina Peck  
 Russula subveternosa Singer  
 Russula subvinosa McNabb  
 Russula subviridella Murrill   
 Russula subviridescens Buyck  
 Russula sulcatipes Murrill  
 Russula sulphurea Velen.   
 Russula synaptica Sarnari  
 Russula syringina (Zvára) Reumaux

T–U

 
 Russula taeniospora Einhell.   
 Russula taigarum Ruots. & Vauras    
 Russula taliensis W. F. Chiu    
 Russula tanzaniae Buyck    
 Russula tapawera (T. Lebel) T. Lebel    
 Russula tawai McNabb   
 Russula tennesseensis Singer   
 Russula tenuiceps Kauffman    
 Russula tenuipilosa Buyck    
 Russula tenuipilosa Buyck    
 Russula tenuithrix Buyck   
 Russula terenopus Romagn.    
 Russula termitaria Buyck    
 Russula terrena Buyck & Sharp    
 Russula testacea Buyck   
 Russula testaceiceps Murrill    
 Russula testaceoaurantiaca Beeli    
 Russula texensis Buyck, Adamcík & D.P. Lewis   
 Russula thapsina Singer & L. D. Gómez    
 Russula theissenii Rick    
 Russula tinctipes J. Blum ex Bon    
 Russula tjibodensis (Henn.) Sacc. & P. Syd.   
 Russula tomentosa Buyck   
 Russula torulosa
 Russula transiens (Singer) Romagn.    
 Russula tricholomopsis McNabb    
 Russula tricolor R. Heim    
 Russula trimbachii Bon    
 Russula tristis Velen.    
 Russula truncigena Britzelm.    
 Russula tuberculata Murrill    
 Russula tuberculosa R. Heim   
 Russula turci
 Russula tyrrhenica Sarnari 
 Russula ulixis Reumaux   
 Russula umbrina B. Knauth  
 Russula umerensis McNabb    
 Russula uncialiformis Murrill    
 Russula uncialis
 Russula undulata Velen.    
 Russula unicolor Romagn.    
 Russula urens Romell   
 Russula usambarae Buyck

V–Z

 Russula vanillina Kucera 
 Russula variata
 Russula variecolor J. Blum   
 Russula variegata Romagn.   
 Russula variegatula Romagn.   
 Russula variicolor Murrill   
 Russula variispora T. Lebel   
 Russula vassilievae Bulach   
 Russula vaurasiana K. Das & J.R. Sharma   
 Russula velenovskyi Melzer & Zvára   
 Russula velutina (Bres.) Buyck   
 Russula velutipes Velen. 1920 (= R. rosea Quél.)
 Russula venezueliana Singer 
 Russula venosa Velen.   
 Russula venosopurpurea Pers.   
 Russula ventricosipes
 Russula venusta Carteret & Reumaux   
 Russula venustissima Carteret & Reumaux 
 Russula verna Singer  
 Russula verrucosa A. Blytt  
 Russula versatilis Romagn.   
 Russula versicolor
 Russula vesca – bare-toothed russula, the flirt
 Russula vesicatoria Murrill   
 Russula veternosa Fr.   
 Russula vinacea Burl. 
 Russula vinaceocuticulata McNabb  
 Russula vinosa Lindblad
 Russula vinosirosea Murrill   
 Russula vinosobrunnea (Bres.) Romagn.
 Russula vinosopurpurea Jul. Schäff.   
 Russula vinososordida Ruots. & Vauras  
 Russula violacea Quél.   
 Russula violaceo-olivascens Bidaud  
 Russula violaceoides Hora  
 Russula violaceoincarnata Knudsen & T. Borgen  
 Russula violaceotunicata Buyck & Courtec.   
 Russula violeipes
 Russula virentirubens Velen.   
 Russula virescens
 Russula virginea Cooke & Massee 
 Russula viridella Peck  
 Russula viridescens R. Heim & Gilles 
 Russula viridicans Carteret & Reumaux   
 Russula viridioculata Burl.   
 Russula viridipes Peck  
 Russula viridirubrolimbata J. Z. Ying   
 Russula viridis Cleland 
 Russula viridofusca Grund  
 Russula viridrobusta Buyck  
 Russula viridulorosea Herp.   
 Russula viroviolacea Imler  
 Russula viscida
 Russula viscidula Buyck  
 Russula viscosa Henn.  
 Russula vitellina (Pers.) Gray   
 Russula vivida McNabb  
 Russula werneri Maire  
 Russula westii Murrill   
 Russula wollumbina Grgur. 
 Russula wrightii Raithelh.  
 Russula xanthophaea Boud.  
 Russula xanthoporphyrea Thiers
 Russula xenochlora P. D. Orton  
 Russula xerampelina (= R. erythropus) – shrimp mushroom 
 Russula xylophila Beeli
 Russula zelleri Burlingham

Taxonomic notes

References

Sources
 

Russula